Swadic Sanudi (born 21 October 1983) is a former Malawian former footballer who played for Dynamos and the Malawi national team as a goalkeeper.

Club career
Sanudi started his career with AmaZulu in 1999, where he made four appearances. He joined Jomo Cosmos in 2000 and made eight appearances for them. He joined Big Bullets in 2001 and made 35 appearances. He moved to Dynamos in 2005 and made 73 appearances. In 2010, he moved to African Wanderers and made 0 appearances. In 2011, he returned to Big Bullets, made no appearances and retired in 2017.

International career
He made his debut for the Malawi national team in 2000. He was named in the 2010 African Cup of Nations team. He started in Malawi's opening game of the competition, keeping a clean sheet in a 3–0 victory over Algeria. He left the team in 2011.

References

1983 births
Living people
Malawian footballers
Malawi international footballers
2010 Africa Cup of Nations players
Malawian expatriate sportspeople in South Africa
Association football goalkeepers
AmaZulu F.C. players
Jomo Cosmos F.C. players
Malawian expatriate footballers
Nyasa Big Bullets FC players
Expatriate soccer players in South Africa
Dynamos F.C. (South Africa) players